Stirling Austin Mortlock AM (born 20 May, 1977) is a former Australian professional rugby union player. He has scored more than 1,000 points in Super Rugby, and nearly 500 test points for the Wallabies. Mortlock is a former Wallaby, Melbourne Rebels and Brumbies captain.

Early life
Born in Sydney, Mortlock began playing rugby with Lindfield Juniors. Mortlock was educated at The King's School in Parramatta Sydney. He represented Gordon Juniors at Colt level and still represents Gordon at club level today. He represented Australia at Under 19 and Under 21 level before pursuing a professional career with the Brumbies.

Professional career

Brumbies career
In 1998, Mortlock joined the ACT Brumbies. He was part of the Brumbies Super Rugby championships team in 2001. In 2004 he succeeded George Gregan as ACT Brumbies Captain and played every game that season except the final due to injury and thus was unable to lead the team to claim the Super 12 title that year.

Wallabies career
Then Wallaby coach Rod Macqueen plucked Mortlock out of club rugby at the young age of 20 to tour Argentina with the Wallabies in 1997.

In 2000, he made his Test debut against Argentina.

2000 was a landmark year for Mortlock – he became the fastest Australian to reach 50 and 100 Test points, he scored the most points and highest number of penalties [16] by any Australian in his first five Tests and created history by becoming the first Australian to score 20 points or more in four consecutive Tests. With the Wallaby team, Mortlock was instrumental in the famous Bledisloe and Tri-Nation Series' Victories of 2000. He scored a sideline penalty goal in 2000 against South Africa in Durban to win Australia's first Tri Nations crown.

Mortlock won man-of-the-match and had an 80-metre intercept try at then-Telstra Stadium to help knock the All Blacks out of the 2003 Rugby World Cup in the semi-final.

In 2006, Mortlock became the 73rd player to captain the Wallabies. In 2007, Mortlock was made co-captain with Phil Waugh.

In February 2008, Mortlock announced that he hoped to continue playing with the Wallabies until at least the end of 2010. Australian Rugby Union CEO John O'Neill endorsed this decision saying that Mortlock is a "real captain courageous" and an "inspirational leader".

He missed Wallabies' selection in October 2010. A press release from the Rebels said Mortlock was recuperating after surgery, and hoped to be "training in full by December."

Melbourne Rebels
The Melbourne Rebels signed Mortlock in March 2010, to a three-year deal for an undisclosed amount.
Mortlock was declared the Rebels inaugural Captain on 2 February 2011, with former Wales international Gareth Delve as Vice-Captain.

In June 2012, Mortlock announced he would retire as a player at the end of the 2012 Super Rugby season, However, in 2013 he continued with the Rebels in a supporting role.

Records and awards

Mortlock was named Super Rugby player of the year in 2002. In 2008, Mortlock's ability to score tries and kick goals positioned him third on the all-time list of Australian Test point scorers (with 473 points). In May 2009, in the Super 14 match between the Auckland Blues and the ACT Brumbies Mortlock became the highest points scorer in Super Rugby history, surpassing New Zealand's Andrew Mehrtens. He currently sits on 1019 Super Rugby points. He is the sixth player for the Brumbies to achieve 100 caps.

Mortlock was made a Member of the Order of Australia in the 2012 Australia Day Honours List.

References

External links
 Stirling Mortlock 
 Stirling Mortlock Melbourne Rebels profile
 Stirling Mortlock and Rod Macqueen photo from Getty Images

 Stirling Mortlock  Brumbies profile from archive.org

Australian rugby union players
Australia international rugby union players
Rugby union centres
Rugby union fullbacks
1977 births
Living people
Rugby union players from Sydney
Australian rugby union captains
ACT Brumbies players
People educated at The King's School, Parramatta
Melbourne Rebels players
Members of the Order of Australia